Benzing is a surname. Notable people with the surname include:

Enrico Benzing (born 1932), Italian engineer and journalist
Johannes Benzing (1913–2001), German diplomat and Linguists of Turkic languages
Mario Benzing (1896–1958), Italian novelist and translator of German origins
Robin Benzing (born 1989), German basketball player